Atal Setu is a  cable-stayed bridge on the Ravi River near Basholi Town ,District Kathua, commissioned on 24 December 2015 by former Defence Minister Manohar Parrikkar. The bridge spans between Basholi and Dunera and aims to improve road connections between Punjab, Jammu and Kashmir and Himachal Pradesh. This bridge is first of its kind in North India and fourth of its kind in nation. The other such three bridges are in Mumbai (Bandra-Worli sealink), Allahabad (Naini) and Kolkata (Hooghly).

IIT New Delhi approved the design of this bridge and the foundation stone was laid in May 2011 by UPA Chairperson Sonia Gandhi. The bridge was designed by a Canadian consultant, McElhanney Consulting Services Ltd. (formerly Infinity Engineering Ltd.). The Border Roads Organization, IRCON, Infinity and SP Singla Constructions Pvt Limited undertook its construction. The bridge is named after former Prime Minister Atal Bihari Vajpayee, and was opened one day before his birthday.

References

Bridges in Punjab, India
Transport in Pathankot
Memorials to Atal Bihari Vajpayee
Cable-stayed bridges in India
2015 establishments in Punjab, India
Bridges completed in 2015